Ella Mensch (5 March 1859 – 5 May 1935) was a German writer, journalist, teacher, feminist and editor.  In 1886 she became one of the first German women to earn a doctorate in German Literature from the University of Zurich along with Marie Nowack. She was associated with the German Female Teacher's Association. She also served as the editor of a women's magazine, Frauen-Rundschau.

Biography
Born on 5 March 1859 in Lübben (Spreewald), Brandenburg, Germany, Ella Mensch was the daughter of Hermann Mensch and Fanny Stantien.  In Berlin she studied at the teachers' college where she graduated with a teacher's certificate in 1879.

In 1880 she moved to Zurich and enrolled at the faculty of philosophy of the University of Zurich where she obtained a doctorate in German Literature before pursuing a long career in journalism and writing. She started her professional career as a news reporter at the Darmstädter Tageblatt, a German daily newspaper, covering opera and drama. She briefly taught at the higher educational institutions for girls in Darmstadt and Frankfurt am Main. 

Since 1893 she was writing series of articles on women's issues. She was also associated with the Deutscher Frauenverein Reform, a German Women's association for reform, established by a group of women including Hedwig Kettler. Her first novel, Der Geopfert, was published in 1902. 

She was 76 years old when she died in Berlin, Germany on 5 May 1935.

References

1859 births
1935 deaths
German women journalists
19th-century German journalists
19th-century German women writers
20th-century German journalists
20th-century German women writers
University of Zurich alumni
People from Lübben (Spreewald)
19th-century women journalists